Petar Dimitrov Zapryanov was born in  Plovdiv, Bulgaria. He is a sport shooter and won a bronze medal in the 50 metre rifle prone event at the 1980 Summer Olympics in Moscow.

References

1959 births
Living people
Olympic shooters of Bulgaria
Olympic bronze medalists for Bulgaria
Shooters at the 1980 Summer Olympics
Shooters at the 1988 Summer Olympics
Shooters at the 1992 Summer Olympics
Olympic medalists in shooting

Medalists at the 1980 Summer Olympics